Jiangxi is a province of China.

Jiangxi may also refer to these places in China:
Jiangxi, Gansu (姜席), a town in Xihe County, Gansu
Jiangxi, Guangxi (江西), a town in Nanning, Guangxi
Jiangxi Subdistrict (江溪街道), a subdistrict of Xinwu District, Wuxi, Jiangsu
Jiangxi province (Yuan dynasty), which included Jiangxi and Guangdong

See also
Jiangxi International, a Chinese construction and engineering company
Jiangxi Air, a Chinese low-cost carrier
Jianxi (disambiguation)
Gangseo District, Seoul, a district of Seoul, South Korea